Susz  is a town in Iława County, Warmian-Masurian Voivodeship, Poland, with 5,600 inhabitants (2004).

Geographical location 

History 

The town was developed at the site of a former Baltic Prussian settlement named Susse, from which comes the town's Polish name Susz. Throughout its history the town carried a rose in its coat of arms (in German Rosenberg means "rose hill"). In 1454, King Casimir IV Jagiellon incorporated the town and the surrounding region to the Kingdom of Poland upon the request of the Prussian Confederation, and, after the subsequent Thirteen Years' War, from 1466 it was part of Poland as a fiefdom held by the Teutonic Knights, which in 1525 was secularized as the Duchy of Prussia. From the 18th century the town, known in German as Rosenberg, was part of the Kingdom of Prussia, and between 1871 and 1945, it was part of the German Reich.

During the Napoleonic Wars, in 1807, the town was occupied by France. In the 19th century, the town's Polish inhabitants were subjected to Germanisation policies. Around 1900, the town had a Protestant church, a Catholic church and a synagogue. The town was the capital of the Rosenberg district in the Prussian Province of West Prussia. According to the census of 1910, Rosenberg had a population of 3,181, of which 3,129 (98.4%) were Germans and 34 (1.1%) were Poles.

After World War I and the re-establishment of independent Poland, during the ongoing Polish-Soviet War, a plebiscite was held in parts of East Prussia and West Prussia on July 11, 1920 to determine whether the region was to remain in Germany or join the Second Polish Republic. In the Rosenberg district, 33,498 (96.9%) voted to remain in Germany and 1,073 (3.1%) voted for Poland. In the town itself, 2,430 votes were cast in favour of Germany and only 8 votes were cast in favour of Poland. Based on that result, the district, along with the town, was included in the Regierungsbezirk West Prussia within the Prussian Province of East Prussia in Germany.

During World War II, from October 26, 1939 until 1945, Rosenberg was part of Regierungsbezirk Marienwerder in Reichsgau Danzig-West Prussia. The Germans operated a subcamp of the Stutthof concentration camp in the town. During the final stages of the war, the town was captured by the Red Army. After the end of war, the town became part of Poland under its Polish name Susz. After the town had been put under Polish administration, almost all German inhabitants who had remained in the town or had returned were expelled to Germany in accordance with the Potsdam Agreement.

Ethnic structure in the 19th century 
According to Prussian data in 1846, the Rosenberg district had 42,480 inhabitants, by mother tongue 34,380 (~81%) were Germans and 8,100 (~19%) were Poles.

Number of inhabitants by year

Notable residents
 Artur Fürst (1880–1926), German-Jewish author
 Beata Żbikowska (born 1934), Polish Olympic middle-distance runner
 Krzysztof Trybusiewicz (born 1949), Polish Olympic modern pentathlete

References

Cities and towns in Warmian-Masurian Voivodeship
Iława County
Castles of the Teutonic Knights

it:Susz